Guanine nucleotide-binding protein G(I)/G(S)/G(O) subunit gamma-11 is a protein that in humans is encoded by the GNG11 gene.

This gene is a member of the guanine nucleotide-binding protein (G protein) gamma family and encodes a lipid-anchored, cell membrane protein.

As a member of the heterotrimeric G protein complex, this protein plays a role in this transmembrane signaling system. This protein is also subject to carboxyl-terminal processing. Decreased expression of this gene is associated with splenic marginal zone lymphomas.

References

Further reading